Morgan Murphy is a national security advisor in the U.S. Senate, former press secretary to the U.S. Secretary of Defense, author, and Captain in the United States Navy Reserve.

Journalism career

Murphy began his career after Rupert Murdoch took note of the student newspaper Murphy edited while at Birmingham–Southern College. The resulting internship at The New York Post led to his first major byline in 1994. In 1996, Murphy joined Vanity Fair after meeting Graydon Carter in an elevator at Condé Nast.  From 1998 to 2000, Murphy worked as a reporter for Forbes under Jim Michaels, and regularly covered small business, entertainment, and the automotive sectors. In 2000, he joined Southern Living and served as the magazine's food critic, executive editor, and national spokesman. The magazine’s parent company, Time Inc., would later publish four of Murphy's five books.

He has appeared on the Travel Channel's American Grilled, The Today Show, Fox & Friends, Fox News, CNN, Sirius XM, Food Talk, Car Talk, NPR, the Speed Channel, and QVC.

Books published as author
Murphy's first book, I Love You – Now Hush, co-authored with author Melinda Rainey Thompson and released in 2010, was named the gold humor book of the year by the American Library Association. 
Murphy's cookbook Off the Eaten Path: Favorite Southern Dives and 150 Recipes that Made Them Famous is a collection of his favorite restaurants and their most famous recipes from the American South.
A sequel Off the Eaten Path: Second Helpings: Tasty eats and delicious stories from the South's less-traveled trails followed in 2013,
In 2014 he published Bourbon & Bacon: The Ultimate Guide to the South's Favorite Food Groups, featuring recipes using bourbon, bacon, or a combination of the two. The book includes a history of bourbon and tasting notes for 75 of his favorite whiskies.
In 2015, he published Off the Eaten Path: On the Road Again: More Unforgettable Foods and Characters from the South's Back Roads and Byways, a third entry in his "Off the Eaten Path" series.

Military career
Murphy joined the United States Naval Reserve in 1999, and has since served on five continents. In 2010, Murphy was called to Afghanistan, where he served in Operation Enduring Freedom as the Director of Media Outreach for the International Security Assistance Force and briefed General David R. Petraeus, 40 general officers, and two ambassadors on a daily basis. In November 2012, he was assigned to the Chairman of the Joint Chiefs of Staff. In March 2020, Murphy was recalled to Washington to work for Secretary of Defense Mark Esper, serving as his traveling press secretary, moderating town halls with Esper and the Chairman of the Joint Chiefs of Staff, and helping the department respond to COVID-19, the BLM riots, and election security. Murphy was promoted to captain by the Secretary of the Navy Kenneth Braithwaite on October 13, 2020. After President Trump fired Mark Esper on November 9th, Murphy continued as press secretary to Acting Secretary of Defense Chris Miller until January 20, 2021.

Military awards and decorations

Classic cars

Murphy is a classic car enthusiast with a special focus on vintage Packards and Cadillacs. In 2005, Murphy discovered "The Duchess" – a 1941 Cadillac limousine created for the abdicated king Edward VIII and his consort Wallis Simpson – in a barn in Fort Worth, Texas.  The car was a one-of-a-kind creation by General Motors' chief designer Harley Earl, under the direction of the company's chairman and chief executive officer, Alfred P. Sloan. When Murphy purchased the car, it was in disrepair and its provenance was unproven.  Murphy conducted a three-year restoration effort, and in November 2013, he offered the car for sale through an RM Auctions and Sotheby's "Art of the Automobile" sale. The auction houses called it "one of the most famous and iconic cars of both American and English society", and suggested the car should sell for between $500,000 and $800,000.

In 2007, Murphy founded Motorpool.com, which was claimed to be the world's first social network for classic car enthusiasts. The launch was backed by more than $1 million in venture capital. In late 2010, Murphy had recently toured the country in a vintage Cadillac to promote the site's launch (and had nine Cadillacs in his possession).

Personal life and education
Murphy was born in Mountain Brook, Alabama (a suburb of Birmingham) and grew up in Birmingham.

He received a Bachelor's degree in 1994 from Birmingham-Southern College (which honored him with its Distinguished Alumni Award in 2013).
He received an MBA from the University of Oxford,  where he was a member of Exeter College and was elected by the university as its "MBA of the Year".
He received his Joint Professional Military Education degree in 2017 from the Naval War College in Newport, Rhode Island.

References

External links

 Official website
 
 Amazon author page

1972 births
Living people
Alumni of Exeter College, Oxford
American bloggers
American food writers
Writers from Birmingham, Alabama
People from Mountain Brook, Alabama
21st-century American non-fiction writers